Tyler Joseph Wagner (born January 24, 1991) is an American former professional baseball pitcher. He played in Major League Baseball (MLB) for the Milwaukee Brewers and Arizona Diamondbacks.

College career
Wagner played college baseball at the University of Utah for the Utah Utes from 2010 to 2012 as a relief pitcher. As a sophomore in 2011, Wagner set the Utes single-season saves record with 12 and finished his career with a school record 17 saves. Overall, he appeared in 57 games in his three seasons in Utah, going 6–10 with a 2.73 earned run average (ERA) and 90 strikeouts in 99 innings.

Professional career

Minor leagues
Wagner was drafted by the Milwaukee Brewers in the fourth round of the 2012 Major League Baseball Draft. He signed with the Brewers and was converted to a starting pitcher. made his professional debut that season with the Helena Brewers. He struggled posting a 7.77 ERA in  innings. Wagner pitched for the Wisconsin Timber Rattlers in 2013 going 10–8 with a 3.21 ERA with 116 strikeouts. He played for the Brevard County Manatees in 2014. He finished the season with 13 wins and a 1.86 ERA. After the regular season, he was promoted to the Double-A Huntsville Stars for the Southern League playoffs.

Milwaukee Brewers
The Brewers promoted Wagner to make his major league debut on May 31. After one start, they optioned him back to the Biloxi Shuckers of the Southern League. Wagner made 3 starts for the Brewers in 2015, posting an 0–2 record, 7.24 ERA, and 5 strikeouts in 13 total innings.

Arizona Diamondbacks
On January 30, 2016, Wagner was traded to the Arizona Diamondbacks along with Jean Segura for Aaron Hill, Chase Anderson, Isan Diaz and cash considerations.

Texas Rangers
Wagner was claimed off waivers by the Texas Rangers on November 18, 2016. Wagner finished his 2016 season with a 1.80 ERA. On April 19, 2017, Wagner was outrighted off of the roster. He spent the 2017 season with the Round Rock Express. In 2018, he played for the Frisco RoughRiders and Round Rock. He elected free agency on November 2, 2018.

References

External links

Utah Utes bio

1991 births
Living people
Sportspeople from the Las Vegas Valley
Baseball players from Nevada
Major League Baseball pitchers
Milwaukee Brewers players
Arizona Diamondbacks players
Utah Utes baseball players
Helena Brewers players
Wisconsin Timber Rattlers players
Brevard County Manatees players
Glendale Desert Dogs players
Biloxi Shuckers players
Reno Aces players
Round Rock Express players
Frisco RoughRiders players